Rumphi United Football Club is a Malawian football club based in Rumphi, Northern region of Malawi. They play their home matches at the Rumphi Stadium– the road on which the ground is located. The club is currently a member of the TNM Super League.

History 
The club was founded in 2019 by Jones Mocktone Mkandawire. The club was promoted to the TNM Super League at the end of the 2020–21 season after beating Embangweni United 3–0 in Northern Region Football Association to enter the top flight of Malawian football. The club also reached the 2021 FDH Bank Knockout Cup semifinals. However, they lost to Ekwendeni Hammers on penalties.

In the 2021–22 season, the club have only won three games. Including a 3–0 win against Mighty Tigers. The club's ground is the Rumphi Stadium where it is a capacity of one thousand (1,000).

Honours
Northern Region Football League
Winners (1): 2020–21

Current squad 2021–22
As of June 2022

References

Football clubs in Malawi